Coppola Foods is an Italian food family owned company with a heritage dating back to 1903 in the production and supply of Italian food products.

History 
 1903: Gerardo Coppola establishes a food-trading and serving business in Fontana Formiello in Mercato San Severino.
 1936: Ernesto Coppola takes over the trading business from his father and expands the trading activities to include pasta, grains and legumes.
 1952: Ernesto Coppola sets up a cannery in Mercato San Severino and starts canning the San Marzano tomatoes grown in the area on an industrial scale.
 1969: Eugenio Coppola joins his father and brothers’ tomato canning business and oversees its growth and expansion.
 2012: Ernesto Coppola and Maria Suleymanova establish Coppola Foods in London, UK, with innovation at its heart to develop the Coppola brand worldwide.
 2015: Coppola Foods sets up a distribution platform in Latin America, Coppola Foods do Brasil, headed by Andrea Carpentieri
 2018: Coppola Foods opens a commercial office in Melbourne, Australia, to serve the Asia Pacific region

Products
 Preserved tomatoes
 Sauces, pesto and soups
 Condiments (ketchup, mayonnaise, oils and vinegars)
 Preserved vegetables (beans, antipasti and olives)
 Grains (rice, farro, barley, millet and polenta)
 Spreads

Brands
 Coppola Salerno
 La Fonte
 D'ARCO
 Fontana FORMIELLO
 Hillfield
 Fabalous

Awards
Fabulous organic cocoa and hazelnut chickpea spread was awarded Innovative Better-For-You Product of the Year at Food Matters Live 2019.

Coppola Foods was one of Europe fastest growing Italian food companies according to 2018 and 2019 Financial Times' FT 1000: Europe's Fastest Growing Companies list.

Coppola Foods is registered in the Registry of Historic Italian Companies. This registry is kept by Unioncamere, the association of Italian Chambers of Commerce, and contains all companies that have been in business for more than 100 years.

References

External links
 Corporate
 Coppola Salerno - Gusto Italiano
 D'Arco - Antipasti Italiani
 Fontana FORMIELLO - Gastronomia
 Hillfield - Store Cupboard Favourites
 Fabalous

Food and drink companies of Italy
Canned food
Food and drink companies of England
Food and drink companies established in 1903
Italian companies established in 1903
Italian brands
Brand name soups
Multinational food companies
Privately held companies of Italy
Food product brands
Companies based in Campania